In mathematics, the Stiefel manifold  is the set of all orthonormal k-frames in  That is, it is the set of ordered orthonormal k-tuples of vectors in  It is named after Swiss mathematician Eduard Stiefel. More generally, the construction applies to any real, complex, or quaternionic inner product space.

Statements about the non-compact form correspond to those for the compact form, replacing the orthogonal group (or unitary or symplectic group) with the general linear group.

Topology
We then have

As a homogeneous space
Each of the Stiefel manifolds  can be viewed as a homogeneous space for the action of a classical group in a natural manner.

Every orthogonal transformation of a k-frame in  results in another k-frame, and any two k-frames are related by some orthogonal transformation. In other words, the orthogonal group O(n) acts transitively on  The stabilizer subgroup of a given frame is the subgroup isomorphic to O(n−k) which acts nontrivially on the orthogonal complement of the space spanned by that frame.

In each case  can be viewed as a homogeneous space:

When k = n, the corresponding action is free so that the Stiefel manifold  is a principal homogeneous space for the corresponding classical group.

The same holds for the action of the special unitary group on 

Thus for k = n − 1, the Stiefel manifold is a principal homogeneous space for the corresponding special classical group.

Uniform measure

The Stiefel manifold can be equipped with a uniform measure, i.e. a Borel measure that is invariant under the action of the groups noted above. For example,  which is isomorphic to the unit circle in the Euclidean plane, has as its uniform measure the obvious uniform measure (arc length) on the circle.

Special cases

Given a 2-frame in  let the first vector define a point in Sn−1 and the second a unit tangent vector to the sphere at that point. In this way, the Stiefel manifold  may be identified with the unit tangent bundle 

When k = n or n−1 we saw in the previous section that  is a principal homogeneous space, and therefore diffeomorphic to the corresponding classical group:

Functoriality
Given an orthogonal inclusion between vector spaces  the image of a set of k orthonormal vectors is orthonormal, so there is an induced closed inclusion of Stiefel manifolds,  and this is functorial. More subtly, given an n-dimensional vector space X, the dual basis construction gives a bijection between bases for X and bases for the dual space  which is continuous, and thus yields a homeomorphism of top Stiefel manifolds  This is also functorial for isomorphisms of vector spaces.

As a principal bundle
There is a natural projection

This projection has the structure of a principal G-bundle where G is the associated classical group of degree k. Take the real case for concreteness. This action is free but not transitive. The orbits of this action are precisely the orthonormal k-frames spanning a given k-dimensional subspace; that is, they are the fibers of the map p. Similar arguments hold in the complex and quaternionic cases.

We then have a sequence of principal bundles:

In other words, the Stiefel manifold  is the orthogonal, unitary, or symplectic frame bundle associated to the tautological bundle on a Grassmannian.

When one passes to the  limit, these bundles become the universal bundles for the classical groups.

Homotopy
The Stiefel manifolds fit into a family of fibrations:

thus the first non-trivial homotopy group of the space  is in dimension n − k. Moreover,

This result is used in the obstruction-theoretic definition of Stiefel–Whitney classes.

See also

Flag manifold
Matrix Langevin distribution

References

 

Differential geometry
Homogeneous spaces
Fiber bundles
Manifolds